Chester Township is the name of two townships in the U.S. state of Indiana:

 Chester Township, Wabash County, Indiana
 Chester Township, Wells County, Indiana

See also: places named Chester Township (disambiguation).

Indiana township disambiguation pages